Dust of Time is a soundtrack album by Greek composer Eleni Karaindrou featuring music for the film The Dust of Time by Theodoros Angelopoulos recorded in 2008 and released on the ECM New Series label.

Reception
The AllMusic review by Thom Jurek awarded the album 4 stars stating "While her many scores for his films have been celebrated for their subtlety and ingenious sense of time and nuance – as well as instrumentation, texture, and color – this one moves across musical cultures as well as across the span of years built into the script. As a piece of music, it walks the line between modern classical music with folk themes and more historical post-Romantic-era composition".

Track listing
All compositions by Eleni Karaindrou
 "Le Temps Perdu" – 2:07   
 "Dance Theme Var II" – 2:40   
 "Notes I" – 1:19   
 "Seeking Var II" – 2:23   
 "Waltz by the River" – 3:33   
 "Unravelling Time I" – 1:21   
 "Tsiganiko I" – 1:22   
 "Dance Theme Var I" – 3:17   
 "Seeking" – 2:37   
 "Memories from Siberia" – 3:16   
 "Unravelling Time II" – 1:21   
 "Notes II" – 2:33   
 "Tsiganiko II" – 1:22   
 "Seeking Var I" – 3:26   
 "Dance Theme" – 4:30   
 "Le Mal Du Pays" – 1:16   
 "Nostalgia Song" – 1:38   
 "Solitude" – 2:21   
 "Adieu" – 2:18  
Recorded at Megaron in Athens, Greece in January (tracks 9 & 15) & March (tracks 1–8, 10–14 & 16–19), 2008

Personnel
 Eleni Karaindrou – piano
 Sergiu Nastasa – violin
 Renato Ripo – cello
 Maria Bildea – harp
 Vangelis Christopoulos – oboe
 Spyros Kazianis – bassoon
 Antonis Lagos – french horn
 Dinos Hadjiiordanou – accordion
 Camerata – Friends of Music Orchestra 
 Natalia Michailidou – piano (tracks 9 & 15)
 Hellenic Radio Television Orchestra conducted by Alexandros Myrat (tracks 9 & 15)

References

ECM New Series albums
ECM Records soundtracks
Eleni Karaindrou albums
2009 albums
Albums produced by Manfred Eicher